Kruspe may refer to any of the following:

 Ed. Kruspe, a brass instrument manufacturer, founded by Carl Kruspe
 Carl Georg Kruspe, a German District Mayor (de)
 Richard Kruspe (born 1967), a German musician and guitarist

German-language surnames